Nelson rules are a method in process control of determining whether some measured variable is out of control (unpredictable versus consistent). Rules for detecting "out-of-control" or non-random conditions were first postulated by Walter A. Shewhart in the 1920s.  The Nelson rules were first published in the October 1984 issue of the Journal of Quality Technology in an article by Lloyd S Nelson.

The rules are applied to a control chart on which the magnitude of some variable is plotted against time. The rules are based on the mean value and the standard deviation of the samples.

The above eight rules apply to a chart of a variable value.

A second chart, the moving range chart, can also be used but only with rules 1, 2, 3 and 4. Such a chart plots a graph of the maximum value - minimum value of N adjacent points against the time sample of the range.

An example moving range: if N = 3 and values are 1, 3, 5, 3, 3, 2, 4, 5 then the sets of adjacent points are (1,3,5) (3,5,3) (5,3,3) (3,3,2) (3,2,4) (2,4,5) resulting in moving range values of (5-1) (5-3) (5-3) (3-2) (4-2) (5-2) = 4, 2, 2, 1, 2, 3.

Applying these rules indicates when a potential "out of control" situation has arisen. However, there will always be some false alerts and the more rules applied the more will occur. For some processes, it may be beneficial to omit one or more rules. Equally there may be some missing alerts where some specific "out of control" situation is not detected. Empirically, the detection accuracy is good.

See also
Common cause and special cause
Statistical process control
Western Electric rules
Westgard rules
American Society for Quality, Quality Tools

References

External links 
 Small Business Guidebook to Quality Management (pdf)
Control Chart

Quality control tools
Technical communication
Statistical charts and diagrams